Graham Shaw (born 8 October 1951) is a Scottish former footballer who made nearly 350 appearances in the Scottish Football League, playing for Dunfermline Athletic, Heart of Midlothian and Arbroath between 1971 and 1985.

External links

1951 births
Living people
Scottish footballers
Dunfermline Athletic F.C. players
Heart of Midlothian F.C. players
Arbroath F.C. players
Footballers from Edinburgh
Scottish Football League players
Musselburgh Athletic F.C. players
Association football forwards
Association football midfielders